Gechi Qeshlaq may refer to:
 Gechi Qeshlaq Amirlu, Ardabil Province
 Gechi Qeshlaq Hajj Mohammadlu, Ardabil Province
 Gechi Qeshlaq-e Olya, East Azerbaijan Province
 Gechi Qeshlaq-e Sofla, East Azerbaijan Province
 Gechi Qeshlaq-e Vosta, East Azerbaijan Province